The Baku International Humanitarian Forum is an event that takes place in Baku, Azerbaijan. It was organized by Ilham Aliyev and Dmitry Medvedev at The First Azerbaijan-Russia Forum on Humanitarian Cooperation in 2010.

The purpose of the Baku International Humanitarian Forum is to discuss and define a strategy for global issues for the coming decades. Among the topics discussed by the forum are practices for coexistence in inclusive societies, promoting universal human rights, achieving sustainable development, countering religious extremism and related terrorism, and promoting multiculturalism.

Events
The first Baku International Humanitarian Forum was held October 10–11, 2011. It was held under the slogan "XXI Century: hopes and challenges". The event was attended by representatives from more than 20 countries. Representatives of 70 countries and 7 international organizations took part in the second forum held October 4–5, 2012. In October 2013, the third forum was held with multiculturalism as the main focus of discussion. 500 people from 63 countries and 4 international organizations took part in the fourth forum in 2014. The fifth forum, which was held in September 2016, attended by representatives from 75 countries. There were 581 participants in sixth forum (October 2018) forum from 86 countries (Russia, Egypt, Slovenia, Uruguay, Italy and Belarus the ministers and deputy ministers of Georgia, Montenegro, Uzbekistan, Bulgaria, Turkey, Sudan, Tajikistan, Kazakhstan, Ukraine, Afghanistan, the Philippines and Bulgaria, ombudsmen from Kazakhstan, Turkey, Tajikistan and Uzbekistan) and 24 international organizations. The VI forum was essentially focused on support for the human capital development policy of Azerbaijan along with promoting the idea of “New World and a New Humanity and Creativity and Human Development.

Concept 
The event bring together many scholars from natural and social sciences, famous statesmen, Nobel Prize's winners in the different branches of science and heads of powerful international organizations (UN, deputy heads of organizations such as ISESCO, IRCICA, TurkPA, TURKSOY, the Black Sea Economic Cooperation Organization (BSEC), the International Turkic Academy (TWESCO), the Inter-Parliamentary Union (IPU), the UN Economic and Social Council (ECOSOC), UNESCO, Executive Committee of the CIS). in order to discuss and suggest solutions to the issues that concern the humanity as a whole.  The form focuses on providing exchange of ideas, theoretical and practical knowledge of the participants.

Format 
The Forum is took place once in every 2 years in Baku city the capital of the Republic of Azerbaijan. The attendants get personal invitation in order to participate in the event. The forum is held in Azerbaijani, English and Russian.

Purpose 
The main purpose of the Baku International Humanitarian Forum is to establish a dialogue, create an arena for discussing global issues, and determine strategy for future. The main duties of the representatives of social and human sciences are aimed to establishing a new humanitarian order, an international consideration of a wide range of global issues. At the sessions and discussions of the forum, important aspects are sharing best practices on coexistence in inclusive societies, promoting universal human rights and achieving sustainable development goals, fighting against religious extremism that is the basis for the emergence of terrorism, and the expansion of multiculturalism. The forum is meant to contribute to the further development of international humanitarian cooperation.

References

Political events
Politics of Azerbaijan